Kairangi Vano (born 8 November 1989) is a New Zealand born Cook islands professional tennis player.

Her career high WTA singles ranking was 678, which she reached on 6 October 2008, high WTA doubles ranking was 712, which she reached on 21 June 2010. She has won one ITF Doubles titles.

Playing for New Zealand Fed Cup team at the Fed Cup, Vano has a win–loss record of 3–2.

Vano made her WTA main draw debut at the 2009 ASB Classic, in the doubles main draw partnering Shona Lee. They lost their only match to Edina Gallovits-Hall and Eva Hrdinová; and earned $860 in prize money.

She won the Women's singles and partnering Brittany Teei Women's doubles Gold medal at the 2009 Pacific Mini Games in Rarotonga for Cook Islands.

She lost Women's Team final New Caledonia won Silver medal at the 2009 Pacific Mini Games in Rarotonga for Cook Islands.

Fed Cup participation

Singles

Doubles

Other finals

Singles

Doubles

Women's team

ITF finals (1–3)

Singles (0–1)

Doubles (1–2)

References

External links
 
 
 

1989 births
Living people
New Zealand female tennis players
Cook Island female tennis players
New Zealand sportspeople of Cook Island descent